FC SKA-Orbita Lviv was a Ukrainian football club from Lviv, Lviv Oblast.

The club was created in 2000 by a former Soviet and later Ukrainian football functionary Anatoliy Tyshchenko at that time when there were discussions for the merger of FC Lviv with FC Karpaty Lviv. Initially the club was based in Boryslav and was called FC Naftovyk Boryslav.

On 18 January 2002 Tyshchenko participated in a conference of professional football clubs in Lviv which discussed a possibility of cooperation.

League and cup history

{|class="wikitable"
|-bgcolor="#efefef"
! Season
! Div.
! Pos.
! Pl.
! W
! D
! L
! GS
! GA
! P
!Domestic Cup
!colspan=2|Europe
!Notes
|}

References

SKA-Orbita Lviv, FC
Football clubs in Lviv
Association football clubs established in 2000
Association football clubs disestablished in 2002
2000 establishments in Ukraine
2002 disestablishments in Ukraine